The Moroccan Airports Authority (ONDA) is the Moroccan airport operator and administrator. The company headquarters are in Mohammed V International Airport in Casablanca.

History
ONDA was established in July 1990 under parliamentary law 14–89. Prior to then, Morocco's airports were administered by the Moroccan Ministry of transport. One year later, ONDA inaugurated Al Massira Airport in Agadir. On 15 September 2003, Abdelhanine Benallou, was nominated as new general manager of ONDA.

Serious airport related accidents
Although Morocco has its share in aircraft accidents, the number of serious incidents with fatalities directly related to an airport (approach, take-off or on ground accidents) are very low. The total number of accidents with fatalities in Morocco is 19, resulting in 792 deaths. The same numbers for events directly related to airports are 5 resp. 171. The majority of the airport related incidents are long ago, the last incident in 1986.

Milestones
 Menara Airport in Marrakech celebrated the arrival of the two millionth passenger on 23 November 2005.
 Al Massira Airport in Agadir gets ISO 9001/2000 certificate on 16 December 2005.

Partnerships and agreements
ONDA helped in supervising the construction of Yasser Arafat International Airport which Mohammed V International Airport is twinned with. It also organized training programs for Palestinian engineers in Morocco in 1997 just months before the inauguration of the airport in Gaza in December 1998.

On 12 March 2003, ONDA signed a partnership agreement with Côte d'Azur International Airport, Nice, France.

New developments and plans
Around 2004 ONDA created a masterplan to upgrade many facilities by 2010. The main projects are: (the planned completion date in brackets)

Mohammed V International Airport - Casablanca

build a new terminal of 60,000 m2 and a total yearly capacity of 10 mln people. (end 2006)
upgrade terminal 1: general overhaul and upgrade T1 to increase traffic-safety (May 2007)
build new cargo terminal of 30,000 m2 and 150,000 tonnes/year. (2007)
build 10 extra aircraft stands (unknown)
new parking facility and transport link (unknown)
reconfigure aprons (unknown)

Al Massira Airport - Agadir

Reshaping the trade zone
Air-conditioning of the air terminal
Strengthening the versatile side of the movement area

Menara Airport - Marrakech

Reshaping and extending Terminal 1 (2006)
new terminal, aircraft stands and transport links (2008)
work on cargo-terminal, taxiway parallel to runway, maintenance infra (unknown)

Dakhla Airport

Building new terminal to separate military and commercial activities (2007)
and other works, including control-tower and national fence

Essaouira Mogador

new passenger terminal (2007)
extending runway, build parking apron, new taxi-way and two support buildings

Ibn Battouta - Tanger

reshape and extend existing terminal (2007 and phase 2:2015)
extending plane-areas: general, runway, plane park, vehicle parking etc.

Rabat-Salé

restructure air terminal (2007)
new roads, new ONDA centre, new pedestrian path etc.

Apart from these larger plans some other smaller changes are planned around many airports around the country.

Salon Convives de Marque
 
Under the name Salon Convives de Marque ONDA offers VIP lounge services at some of the airports it manages. Services offered include access to the VIP lounge, assistance during check-in, retrieving luggage, boarding and assistance with the 'formalities' (passport-control, security etc.) (fast lanes or priority boarding). The VIP service is not linked to any specific airline: anyone can apply for membership. Currently the VIP service is offered at the following airports: Mohammed V (Casablanca), Rabat-Salé, Fes-Saïss, Agadir, Marrakech and Tangier

Access to the VIP service can be bought by individuals (18.000,- Dirham), couples (24.000 Dh) and companies/organisations (60.000 Dh + 150 Dh per user)

Statistics 
As the national operator for all public airports in Morocco the information they publish on flight-movements give a strong indication of the development of visitors and flights to the country. Also the cargo-figures tell something about the economy.

The ONDA publishes monthly reports which contain number of passengers per airport and an overall total of aircraft-movements (landings and take-offs) and cargo figures for the whole country.

Despite the international crisis, which hits Europe and North-America the most, the Moroccan airport authority reports continuously increasing passenger-numbers, aircraft-movements and processed cargo.

Trends 
The summer-months are by far the busiest months for passengers. Not only tourists traveling to the main tourist locations as Marrakesh and Agadir see high volumes of passengers, also the airports in the North of Morocco see increasing passenger-numbers. Moroccans who live in Europe tend to visit family during the summer and although many of them still come over by ferry increasing numbers of people come by air.
Other indications of this are for example:
 Ryanair operating regular flights to/from Nador, Fes, Oujda, Tanger and then also Marrakesh and Agadir in the South
 In the summer months at least once a week the scheduled flights operated by Royal Air Maroc use a Boeing 747 instead of the normal Boeing 737
 other cheap airlines like Jet4you, Germanwings and AirArabiaMaroc operate scheduled flights to the Northern cities like Oujda, Nador, Fes, Al-Hoceima and Tanger

The increase in passengers overall in 2010, compared to 2009 was +14,93% and this trend continued in 2011 – although not as spectacular. The year-on-year growth in passengernumbers in July 2011 was still +6,28%

Busiest airports 
The main international airport, Mohammed V in Casablanca, handles over 40% of all aircraft movements (landings and take-offs) and the second airport, Marrakesh, handles another 15%

Cargo 
Unlike the passenger-numbers the amount of cargo to and from Moroccan airports is quite stable after an initial drop around 2008.

Origin 
By far the majority of traffic comes from Europe, where France is responsible for 30-35% of all traffic and the rest of Europe produces 40-45% of all traffic. Domestic flights are responsible for 10% of traffic.
Other destinations to/from Morocco are North America (2-2,5%), Middle & Far-East (5%) and Africa (Maghreb: 3,5; rest of Africa: 6%)

References

External links
 Moroccan Airports Authority
 ONDA official website 
 ONDA official website 

1990 establishments in Morocco
Government agencies established in 1990
 
Airport operators
Government-owned companies of Morocco
20th-century architecture in Morocco